The  is the common name for the JR West rail lines in the Hiroshima metropolitan area. The network was created on October 5, 2002, and modeled after the Urban Network in the Kyōto-Osaka-Kōbe area of Japan. Unlike the Urban Network, the Hiroshima City Network was not created in order to serve the suburbs and surrounding environs of a large city, but rather to service primarily stations within 30–40 minutes of Hiroshima Station.

Between Hiroshima Station and Kaitaichi Station (which is quadruple-track), the outside two tracks are exclusively for passenger trains, while the inside two tracks are used primarily for freight trains, allowing for expansion of the use by passenger trains according to demand.

Notes

Citations

References